Devosa may refer to:

337 Devosa, a main-belt asteroid
USS Devosa (AKA-27), an Artemis-class attack cargo ship of the United States Navy